Ben Lomond is an interim Australian bioregion located in the north eastern region of Tasmania, comprising .

See also

 Ecoregions in Australia
 Interim Biogeographic Regionalisation for Australia
 Regions of Tasmania

References

Further reading
 

Ben Lomond
IBRA regions
North East Tasmania
East Coast Tasmania